Plaošnik or simply Plaoš is an archaeological site and holy place in Ohrid, 250 meters below Samuil's Fortress. In the future, the whole complex will have konaks (mansions) as in the time of Saint Clement of Ohrid, together with several surrounding objects.

Archaeological sites

St. Clement’s Church

The church was built by St. Clement in the year 893 on the foundation of an early Christian basilica, and dedicated to St. Panteleimon. It was here that the Ohrid Literary School, a center of Slavonic literary and cultural activity where more than 3,500 disciples were educated. St. Clement was buried in this church, in the tomb which was built by his own hands.

After the advent of the Ottoman Empire, St. Clement's church was converted into a mosque, known as the Imaret Mosque, of which only a small enclosure remains. The mosque was built as an endowment and a memorial by Sinan Chelebi, member of the distinguished Turkish family of the Ohrizade. The Imaret Mosque was torn down in 2000 with the reason given that it was constructed over the remains of a church in the Plaošnik area and the former mosque was added to the damaged religious buildings list compiled by the Islamic Religious Community of Macedonia.

Apart from the church's many reconstructions during the time of the Ottoman Empire, it has undergone extensive reconstruction and excavation in the contemporary period. The most recent restoration started on 8 December 2000 and was completed by 10 August 2002. Most of Saint Clement's relics were translated to the church.

Baptistery
On Plaošnik has been discovered the baptistery of the five aisle basilica with hooked crosses (swastikas) on the mosaic floors which date from the period between 4th and 6th century. It is assumed that this early Christian basilica at Plaoshnik upon which the Kliment's monastery was built in the 9th century, was dedicated to St. Paul the Apostle who preached Christianity in Lychnidos (present-day Ohrid) in the 1st century A.D.

On 10 October 2007, a deposit of approximately 2,383 Venetian coins was discovered by archaeologists while excavating the monastery. A prominent archaeologist of the Republic of Macedonia, Pasko Kuzman, stated that the coins are of special significance because they indicate that Ohrid and Venice were commercially linked.

See also
Ohrid

References

Gallery

Archaeological sites in North Macedonia
Ohrid
Golden Age of medieval Bulgarian culture